Lower Clarendon Gorge State Forest, also known as Lower Clarendon Gorge State Park, covers  around Lower Clarendon Gorge on Mill River in Clarendon, Vermont. The site was donated to the state by the Vermont River Conservancy in the 2000s.

There are hiking trails along the scenic gorge and a pedestrian bridge.

References

External links
Official website

Vermont state forests
Protected areas of Rutland County, Vermont
Clarendon, Vermont